The NASA Early Career Achievement Medal (ECAM) is awarded to any Government employee for unusual and significant performance during the first 10 years of an individual's early career (i.e., entry-level professional in a scientific, engineering, administrative professional or technical position) in support of the Agency.

Performance is characterized by unusual initiative or a creative achievement that clearly demonstrates a significant contribution in the individual's discipline area that directly contributes to NASA's mission and goals. The contribution is significant, in that, for an employee who is at such an early phase of career, the contribution has substantially improved the discipline area.

These criteria also include the following:
 The achievement yields high-quality results and/or substantial improvements to the discipline.
 Impact of the employee's achievement has significant importance relative to the discipline area.
 The achievement is perceived as outstanding or significant by peers and/or impacted target groups.

Precedence

Selected recipients by year
There are usually more than 5 recipients of this medal annually.

 Eliad Peretz, Goddard Space Flight Center, 2021.
 Lynnae Quick, Goddard Space Flight Center, 2022.

References

Awards and decorations of NASA